Izet Arslanović (born 26 May 1973) is a Bosnian retired football player.

International career
Arslanović made three appearances for Bosnia and Herzegovina, all at the 1997 Dunhill Cup in Kuala Lumpur. His final international was against China.

References

External links

Profile - NFSBIH

1973 births
Living people
Association football midfielders
Bosnia and Herzegovina footballers
Bosnia and Herzegovina international footballers
NK Travnik players
NK Jedinstvo Bihać players
NK Osijek players
NK Marsonia players
Premier League of Bosnia and Herzegovina players
Croatian Football League players
Bosnia and Herzegovina expatriate footballers
Expatriate footballers in Croatia
Bosnia and Herzegovina expatriate sportspeople in Croatia